Philip Buys (30 September 1988, Durban) is a South African cross-country mountain biker. At the 2012 Summer Olympics, he competed in the Men's cross-country at Hadleigh Farm, finishing in 35th place.

Major results
2011
 3rd  Cross-country, African Mountain Bike Championships
2012
 1st  Cross-country, African Mountain Bike Championships
2013
 1st  Cross-country, African Mountain Bike Championships
 1st  Cross-country, National Mountain Bike Championships
2014
 1st  Cross-country, African Mountain Bike Championships
2016
 1st  Cross-country, African Mountain Bike Championships
 2nd Cross-country, National Mountain Bike Championships
2017
 2nd Cross-country, National Mountain Bike Championships
2019
 2nd  Cross-country, African Mountain Bike Championships
 3rd Cross-country, National Mountain Bike Championships

References

1988 births
South African male cyclists
Cross-country mountain bikers
Living people
Sportspeople from Durban
Olympic cyclists of South Africa
Cyclists at the 2012 Summer Olympics
White South African people
South African mountain bikers
20th-century South African people
21st-century South African people